Latvia competed at the 2007 World Championships in Athletics with a squad of 11 athletes.

Results

Competitors 

Nations at the 2007 World Championships in Athletics
World Championships in Athletics
Latvia at the World Championships in Athletics